Anna Kalata (born 10 May 1964, Milanówek, Poland) is a Polish politician, celebrity and occasional actress. She was a member of the populist Samoobrona party.  In Jarosław Kaczyński's cabinet she was the minister of labour and social policy.  She participated in the 12th season of Taniec z Gwiazdami (the Polish version of Dancing With The Stars). After losing  she appeared on the cover of Shape magazine.

References

1964 births
Living people
People from Milanówek
Self-Defence of the Republic of Poland politicians